The C-class blimp was a patrol airship developed by the US Navy shortly after World War I, a systematic improvement upon the B-type which was very suitable for training, but of limited value for patrol work. Larger than the B-class, these blimps had two motors and a longer endurance. Once again, the envelope production was split between Goodyear and Goodrich, with control cars being built by the Burgess division of Curtiss Aeroplane and Motor Company. Originally the Navy ordered 30 but reduced the number to 10 after the armistice in November 1918. All ten of the "C" type airships were delivered in late 1918, and examples served at all of the Navy's airship stations from 1918 to 1922. In 1921, the C-7 was the first airship ever to be inflated with helium. The Navy decommissioned its last two remaining C-type blimps, the C-7 and  C-9 in 1922.

Operations
Arriving too late for the war, the C-type became a sort of experimental airship and was used for a variety of activities besides training. C-1 was the first airship to release an airplane in flight when the C-1 dropped a Curtiss JN-4 over Fort Tilden, New York on 12 December 1918. C-1 also tested a job which Navy blimps would also perform for the rest of their service. It was flown to Key West, Florida where it tracked torpedoes fired in practice from submarines. The most notable C-type was the C-5, which was flown to St. Johns, Newfoundland, where it was to attempt a transatlantic flight in competition with the US Navy's heavier-than-air Curtiss NC flying boats. In the unofficial  race to be the first to cross the Atlantic by air, in addition to the C-5 and NC flying boats, there were two British entrants. This "race", though unofficial, drew much public interest on both sides of the Atlantic and received extensive coverage by the press in the US and Europe. The attempt ended when a sudden windstorm tore  the unmanned C-5 from the hands of the ground crew and it was blown out to sea and lost. Two C-type blimps were transferred to the US Army. On 2 July 1919, the C-8 suddenly exploded while landing at Camp Holabird, Maryland, injuring about
80 civilians who were watching it. Windows in homes a mile away were shattered by the blast.
The C-3 caught fire while airborne on 7 July 1921 and burned at Naval Air Station Hampton Roads, Norfolk, Virginia.

Fat Man nuclear bomb
The first US nuclear bombs, the Fat Man (Mark III) had incredibly bad ballistics. Los Alamos engineers, in an effort to fit the awkward shape of the weapon into an aerodynamically sound shape, based the Mark IV bomb casing upon the shape of the C-type blimp envelope.

Operators

United States Navy
United States Army

Specifications (typical)

See also
 List of airships of the United States Navy

References

 
 
 

1910s United States patrol aircraft
Airships of the United States Navy
Goodyear aircraft
Aircraft first flown in 1918